
Tatra County is a unit of territorial administration and local government (powiat) in Lesser Poland Voivodeship, southern Poland, on the Slovak border. It came into being on January 1, 1999, as a result of the Polish local government reforms passed in 1998. The county takes its name from the Tatra mountain range, which covers most of its territory.

As of 2006 its total population is 65,393, out of which the population of Zakopane is 27,486 and the rural population is 37,907.

The mountainous southern part of the county (211 km2) makes up the Tatra National Park. This area, together with the Slovak Tatra National Park across the border, make up a UNESCO-designated biosphere reserve.

Neighbouring counties
Tatra County is bordered by only one other Polish county, Nowy Targ County, which lies to the north. To the east, west and south it is bordered by Slovakia (namely, Tvrdošín and Liptovský Mikuláš Districts in Žilina Region to the south and west, and Poprad District in Prešov Region to the south and east).

Administrative division
The county is subdivided into five gminas (one urban and four rural). These are listed in the following table, in descending order of population.

See also

 Małe Ciche

References

Polish official population figures 2006

 
Tatra